The Bill is a British police procedural television series, first broadcast on ITV from 16 August 1983 until 31 August 2010. The programme originated from a one-off drama, Woodentop, broadcast in August 1983.

The programme focused on the lives and work of one shift of police officers of all ranks, rather than on any one particular aspect of police work, therefore the storylines dealt with situations faced by uniformed officers working "on the beat", as well as plainclothes detectives.  The Bill was the longest-running police procedural television series in the United Kingdom, and among the longest running of any British television series at the time of its cancellation. The title originates from "Old Bill", a slang term for the police - but in particular the Metropolitan Police Service of London.

Although highly acclaimed by fans and critics, the series attracted controversy on several occasions. An episode broadcast in 2008 was criticised for featuring fictional treatment for multiple sclerosis. The series has also faced more general criticism concerning its levels of violence, particularly prior to 2009, when it occupied a pre-watershed slot. The Bill won several awards, including BAFTAs, a Writers' Guild of Great Britain award, and Best Drama at the Inside Soap Awards in 2009, this being the series' fourth consecutive win.

Throughout its 27-year run, the programme was always broadcast on the main ITV network. In later years, episodes of the show were repeated on ITV3 on their week of broadcast. The series has also been repeated on other digital stations, including Gold, Alibi, W, Dave, and Drama.

In March 2010, following a spell of declining audiences and negative public and media reception, executives at ITV announced that the network did not intend to recommission The Bill and that filming would cease on 14 June 2010. The final episode aired on 31 August 2010.

As of May 2022, a reboot is said to be in development by UKTV.

History

The Bill was originally conceived by Geoff McQueen in 1983, then a new television writer, as a one-off drama. McQueen had originally titled the production Old Bill. It was picked up by Michael Chapman for ITV franchise holder Thames Television, who retitled it Woodentop as part of Thames's "Storyboard" series of one-off dramas and broadcast on ITV under the title Woodentop on 16 August 1983. Woodentop starred Mark Wingett as PC Jim Carver and Trudie Goodwin as WPC June Ackland of London's Metropolitan Police, both attached to the fictional Sun Hill police station.

Although originally only intended as a one-off, Woodentop so impressed ITV that a full series was commissioned, first broadcast on 16 October 1984 with one post-watershed episode per week, featuring an hourlong, separate storyline for each episode of the first three series. The first episode of the full series was "Funny Ol' Business – Cops & Robbers". With serialisation, the name of the show changed from Woodentop to The Bill. Series one had 11 episodes and was broadcast in 1984, series two and three had 12 episodes each and were broadcast in 1985-6 and 1987 respectively. With a full ensemble cast to explore new characters not featured or just mentioned in Woodentop, the focus of the storylines soon shifted away from new recruit Carver and towards Detective Inspector Roy Galloway and Sergeant Bob Cryer.

The series then changed to two 30-minute episodes per week, on Tuesdays and Thursdays in 1988 (from July 1988 onwards, and began being broadcast all year round without a summer break), increasing to three a week beginning in 1993, with the third episode being broadcast on Fridays. In 1998, The Bill returned to hour-long episodes, which later became twice-weekly, with the Friday episode being dropped, at which point the series adopted a much more serialised approach. When Paul Marquess took over as executive producer in 2002, as part of a drive for ratings, the series was revamped, bringing more of a soap-opera feel to many of its stories. Many veteran characters were written out, leading to the Sun Hill fire during 2002. Marquess stated that the clearout was necessary to introduce "plausible, powerful new characters". As part of the new serial format, much more of the characters' personal lives were explored but, as Marquess put it, the viewers still "don't go home with them". The change also allowed The Bill to become more reflective of modern policing, with the introduction of officers from ethnic minorities, most notably the new superintendent, Adam Okaro. It also allowed coverage of the relationship of homosexual Sergeant Craig Gilmore and PC Luke Ashton, a storyline which Marquess was determined to explore before rival Merseybeat.

In 2005, Johnathan Young took over as executive producer. The serial format was dropped and The Bill returned to stand-alone episodes with more focus on crime and policing than on the officers' personal lives. 2007 saw the reintroduction of episode titles, which had been dropped in 2002. In 2009, The Bill moved back to the 9 pm slot it previously held, and the theme tune, "Overkill", was replaced as part of a major overhaul of the series.

Cancellation

On 26 March 2010, ITV announced that it would be cancelling the series later that year after 26 years on air. ITV said that this decision reflected the "changing tastes" of viewers. The last episode of The Bill was filmed in June 2010 and broadcast on 31 August 2010 followed by a documentary titled Farewell The Bill. Fans of the show started a 'Save the Bill' campaign on social networking website Facebook to persuade ITV to reconsider the cancellation, and BBC Radio 1's Chris Moyles promoted the campaign on air.

At the time the series ended in August 2010, The Bill was the United Kingdom's longest-running police drama and was among the longest-running of any British television series. The series finale, entitled "Respect", was aired in two parts and was dedicated to "the men and women of the Metropolitan Police Service past and present". The finale storyline concerned gang member Jasmine Harris being involved in the murder of fellow member Liam Martin who died in the arms of Inspector Smith after being stabbed. Jasmine is then gang raped because she talked to the police, and when Callum Stone found the person responsible he was held at gunpoint. Of the finale's title, executive producer Jonathan Young said "It's called "Respect" and we hope it will respect the heritage of the show".  The finale episodes featured all the cast and the final scene was specially written so all cast members would be featured. Following the final episode, ITV aired a documentary entitled Farewell The Bill which featured interviews from past and present cast and crew members. The finale was watched by 4.4 million viewers, with Farewell The Bill averaging 1.661 million viewers.

Possible revival
On 17 April 2021, various media outlets began reporting that the series may be set for a reboot. Writer Simon Sansome was understood to have bought the rights to the original series, and was planning a revival, dubbed Sun Hill (as licensing meant the series could not be named The Bill once more), alongside Holby City creator and former EastEnders writer Tony McHale, who had previously written episodes of The Bill and one of its spin-offs, Beech is Back. Sansome had been in talks with various cast members during a 2020 reunion and discussed possible appearances for show legends Mark Wingett (Jim Carver), Trudie Goodwin (June Ackland) and Graham Cole (Tony Stamp). However, no official date had been set for a return, nor had the mooted Sun Hill project been picked up by any TV network. On 18 April, Mark Wingett confirmed this on his Twitter account, stating they had been "approached" by production companies but the Sun Hill project had not been given the green light.

Broadcasting and production

Filming locations

Throughout the series, there have been three filming locations for Sun Hill police station. From the first series, the police station consisted of a set of buildings in Artichoke Hill, Wapping, East London. However, these buildings were next to the News International plant and during the winter of 1985–86 there was much industrial action which resulted in some altercations between the strikers and what they thought were the real police but were actually actors working on The Bill. Working conditions got so dire, that the production team realised they needed to find another base to set Sun Hill police station.

The second location was an old record distribution depot in Barlby Road, North Kensington in North West London. Filming began here in March 1987. In 1989, the owners of the Barlby Road site ordered The Bill out, due to their redevelopment plans for the area. After an extensive search, two sites were selected, the favourite being a disused hospital in Clapham. However, this fell through and the second option was chosen—an old wine distribution warehouse in Merton, South West London. The move was made in March 1990 and was disguised on screen by the 'ongoing' refurbishment of Sun Hill police station and then finally the explosion of a terrorist car-bomb in the station car-park, which ended up killing PC Ken Melvin.

Filming for the series took place all over London, mainly in South London and particularly the London Borough of Merton, where the Sun Hill set was located. Locations used when the show was filmed on a housing estate included:
 Cambridge Estate, in Kingston, south-west London
 High Path Estate, in South Wimbledon, south-west London (approx. 10-minute walk from the Sun Hill set)
 Alton Estate, in Roehampton, south-west London
 Phipps Bridge, Mitcham
 Roundshaw Estate in Wallington, London
 Sutton Estate, which includes Durand Close in Carshalton, where a housing block regularly used by The Bill for filming was demolished in November 2009.

Scenes were often filmed in east London, most notably the London Docklands, with other scenes filmed in Tooting, Greenwich and Croydon among other locations around London.

The Bill's set of "Sun Hill" police station remained until mid 2013 when it was finally dismantled.

Locations from individual episodes
 Brockwell Lido, SE24 0PA: "Sun Hill Boulevard" series 15, 31 August 1999
 Former Salvation Army Men's Hostel (now demolished), SE16 3FE: "Lock In" series 15, 9 December 1999
 Crossness Pumping Station, SE2 9AQ: "Haunted" series 15, 23 December 1999
 Centre Court Shopping Centre, SW19 8YA: "All Fall Down, Part 1" series 16, 27 October 2000
 The Gorbals, Glasgow (now demolished): "Demolition Girl", series 24, 21 August 2008

"Sun Hill"

The Bill is set in and around Sun Hill police station, in the fictional "Canley Borough Operational Command Unit" in East London. Geoff McQueen, creator of The Bill, claimed that he named Sun Hill after a street name in his home town of Royston, Hertfordshire.

The fictional Sun Hill suburb is located in the fictional London borough of Canley in the East End, north of the River Thames. The Borough of Canley is approximately contiguous to the real-life London Borough of Tower Hamlets, and in the first few years of The Bill, Sun Hill police station was actually stated as being located in Wapping in Tower Hamlets. Sun Hill has a London E1 postcode (the 'address' of Sun Hill police station is given as '2 Sun Hill Road, Sun Hill, Canley E1 4KM'), which corresponds to the real-life areas of Whitechapel and Stepney.

Production details
When filming The Bill, some outdoor scenes were re-enacted indoors with microphones surrounding the actors and the extra sounds being "dubbed" on later.  Some of the more aggressive scenes were also filmed indoors either for dubbing or safety reasons. The sirens used in the series were added later in the dubbing suite as The Bill did not have permission to use them while on location. However, the police uniforms used in the series were genuine, again making The Bill unique amongst police dramas. When the series ended, London's Metropolitan Police Service, after talks with the production company, bought 400 kilograms of police-related paraphernalia, including uniforms and body armour, to prevent them falling into the hands of criminals after the programme's production ceased.

The Bill is unique amongst police dramas in that it takes a serial format, focusing on the work and lives of a single shift of police officers, rather than on one particular area of police work. Also unique is that The Bill adapted to this format after several series, whereas comparable series started with the serial format.

Broadcast in the United Kingdom
During its initial broadcast, The Bill was always shown on ITV. In 2009, STV, ITV's regional franchise in Central and Northern Scotland, opted out of broadcasting the series along with a number of other dramas, a decision that later became the subject of legal proceedings between STV and the main ITV network. The legal dispute was settled on 27 April 2011, with ITV receiving £18 million from STV.

Aside from repeats of episodes on ITV3, which occurred on the original week of their broadcast, the show has regularly been repeated on other digital stations. Re-runs of the series began on 1 November 1992, when new digital channel UKTV Gold began broadcasting. The channel broadcast repeats of the series for nearly 16 years, until 6 October 2008, when the channel was given a revamp by the owners of the network. During the 16-year period, re-runs of the series covered every episode broadcast between 16 October 1984, and 8 March 2007. On 7 October 2008, UKTV launched a new British drama channel, Alibi, and from this point on, episodes of the series were broadcast at 8 am. Alibi broadcast episodes until 23 December 2009, when the show was taken from the channel's schedule due to poor viewer feedback. During the 14 months that the show broadcast on Alibi, the channel covered all of the episodes broadcast between 25 August 1998 and 27 February 2002. On 27 January 2010, UKTV relocated The Bill to one of its more recent entertainment channels, Watch, which began by airing the episode "Sweet Revenge", broadcast on 21 March 2007, continuing in broadcast order, carrying on from where UKTV Gold, had finished. Through the course of the year, the channel continued to broadcast episodes from the latter years of the show, concluding in November 2010 with the episode "Conviction: Judgement Day", broadcast on 16 July 2009. Following a short break from the network, the series returned in December 2010, beginning with Episode #001, broadcast on 28 February 2002. This continued on from the broadcast order of episodes repeated on Alibi, carrying on from where the network had finished. As of April 2012, Watch had repeated every single episode from 28 February 2002 to 24 February 2005, and was to begin airing episodes from March 2005. In July 2013 the show started to be broadcast by UKTV channel Drama, starting with episodes from 1998. On 14 August 2017, Drama started showing The Bill from the beginning. As of 6 November, Drama jumped approximately a decade.

Broadcast outside the UK
The Bill has been broadcast in over 55 countries.
 In Australia, The Bill was shown on the ABC. The final episode was shown on 16 October 2010, with Farewell The Bill shown the following week on 23 October. On Wednesday 3 February 2016, ABC commenced repeated the series from the pilot episode until midway through series 7 in an afternoon weekday timeslot, with early-morning repeats.  The ABC does not have the rights to show series 8 to the last episode of series 26.
 On pay television services in Australia and New Zealand, older episodes were previously broadcast on UKTV. The Bill was re-aired on ABC TV from series 1 from July 2017 in the 5.00 am time slot.
 In Denmark, the series was retitled "Lov og Uorden" (Law and Disorder). Two episodes of the series were broadcast every afternoon on TV2 Charlie.
 In Ireland, the series was broadcast on RTÉ television, first starting in the early 1990s on RTÉ Two, and in the early 2000s RTÉ began broadcasting it on RTÉ One at 5:30 pm each weekday, splitting hour long episodes into two-part half-hour episodes. RTÉ discontinued this in 2009, moving the show to Monday Nights on RTÉ Two. RTÉ showed episodes from 2005. In 2010, RTÉ moved the show from its prime time slot on RTÉ Two to a midnight slot on RTÉ One on Thursday nights, but the show remained on the RTÉ Player.
 In Sweden, the series was retitled "Sunhills polisstation" (Sun Hill Police Station) by broadcaster TV4. In 2011, it was broadcast daily on Kanal 9 in the early afternoon with a repeat early the following morning.

Themes and title sequences
 The series' pilot episode, Woodentop, featured a short theme composed by Mike Westergaard that was used specifically for the episode and never used at any other time during the main series. The episode's title sequence consisted of the word Woodentop being spelt out letter-by-letter, as if it were being typed out on a typewriter.
 The first-ever opening sequence of The Bill was first seen in the episode "Funny Ol' Business – Cops & Robbers". The sequence consisted of two police officers, one male and one female, walking down a street while images of Sun Hill were interspersed between them. This sequence was used for the first series only. It featured the first version of the iconic theme tune, "Overkill", composed by Charlie Morgan and Andy Pask. The theme is notable for its use of septuple meter. The end titles of the series simply showed the feet of the two police constables pounding the beat.
 In the show's second series, the opening sequence consisted of a police car, a Rover SD1, racing down a street with its siren wailing and its blue light flashing. The car would screech to a stop, and the camera zoomed in on the blue light. Various clips were then shown from the series of the characters in action, often chasing suspects. This sequence kept the first version of "Overkill", and also used the same ending credits from series one. This sequence was also used in the third series.
 From the fourth series onwards, the opening sequence was kept generally the same, but the clips used were regularly updated to remove departed characters and keep current with the show's events. Minor changes to the sequence included the Rover SD1 changing into a Ford Sierra in 1993, which was replaced by a Vauxhall Vectra in 1997. In the 1997 sequence, the Vectra was seen overtaking a Leyland Titan bus, before screeching to a halt, and the main sequence starting. The end credits remained the same, but a new version of "Overkill" was used, also composed by Andy Pask and Charlie Morgan.
 On 6 January 1998, starting with "Hard Cash", the third episode of the show's 14th series, the title sequence and theme used for nearly 10 years were scrapped. This time, the title sequence consisted of various police procedural images, including a suspect being shown into a police cell, another suspect being interviewed, and a third posing for mug-shot photographs. Clips of any actors featured were removed, as was the initial sequence involving the police car racing down the street. Mark Russell revamped "Overkill", giving it a jazz feel, with the majority of the theme played by a saxophone. The end credits of the series were also completely revamped. This time, the credits featured various images of the Metropolitan Police uniform, combined with images of feet tapping on a kerb. A longer version of "Overkill," composed by Mark Russell, was also used in the final credits. These opening and closing sequences were used for nearly three years, although both saw minor updates on 11 February 1999. The text sequence at the very start of the opening sequence was changed into a different font, and the images of the police uniform and feet tapping on a curb were removed from the closing sequence to make way for a preview of the next episode. The closing sequence remained this way until 16 February 2001, but the opening titles were once again updated in 5 September 2000 to remove certain images from the sequence to make it shorter. It is also noted that during this period, a 'previously on The Bill' segment was aired before the title sequence, to inform viewers what had occurred in the last episode.
 On 20 February 2001, starting with "Going Under", the 14th episode of the show's 17th series, the opening and closing sequences were again scrapped to make way for a completely new sequence and theme. This time, the opening sequence consisted of a montage image of the entire cast, backed by a darker, slower version of "Overkill". The closing credits featured a montage of various police-related images, also backed by the new version of "Overkill". The opening sequence was designed by the visuals company "Blue", and the new arrangement of "Overkill" was produced by Miles Bould and Mike Westergaard. These titles remained essentially the same for two years, with two small updates. The font used on the closing credits was changed towards the end of 2001, and the characters featured in the opening sequence were updated in 9 May 2002, to remove characters who had departed, and include new characters. These titles were broadcast from Episode No. 017, and are notable as several of the characters in these titles had not yet appeared in the show. DS Samantha Nixon appeared in the titles from Episode No. 017, but did not first appear until Episode No. 038, some four months later.
 On 26 February 2003, starting with Episode No. 091, the opening and closing sequences were once again updated. This time, the opening sequence consisted of several generic police images, such as a police car and uniform. A new arrangement of "Overkill", composed by Lawrence Oakley, was also used for both the opening and closing sequences. The background of the closing sequence, designed by company "Roisin at Blue", was simply a police shade of blue, with all generic images being removed. Throughout its four-year use, these titles were never updated or changed, with the exception of the police shade of blue, which was changed to a dark shade of black in 2006.
 On 3 January 2007, starting with Episode No. 471, the opening and closing sequences were once again changed. This time, the opening sequence, for the first time, features an image of the Sun Hill sign, and returns to featuring images of officers in action. This sequence also featured a further new arrangement of "Overkill", once again arranged by Lawrence Oakley. This time, the closing sequence follows a police car on patrol, watching it as it drives through the streets of Sun Hill. These titles were used for nearly two and a half years.
 On 23 July 2009, after the programme underwent a major overhaul, the opening sequence and theme were heavily changed. This time, the classic "Overkill" theme was completely removed, and a new theme created by Simba Studios was used. However, producer Jonathan Young stated that echoes of "Overkill" can still be heard in the theme. The opening sequence featured a patrol car driving through the streets of Sun Hill. The closing sequence follows the same patrol car, however, this time, from an overhead view. These titles remained the same until the show's final episode, where the theme tune was replaced by a final version of "Overkill", in homage to the show.

Episodes

When The Bill was first commissioned as a series by ITV, it started with 12 episodes per year, each an hour long with a separate storyline. In 1988, the format changed to a year-round broadcast with two 30-minute episodes per week. In 1993, this expanded to three 30-minute episodes per week. In 1998, the broadcast format changed to two one-hour episodes each week, also recording in 16:9 widescreen Digibeta. In 2009, The Bill began broadcasting in HD and as part of a major revamp, was reduced to broadcasting once a week. The Bill finished on 31 August 2010 after 2,425 episodes.

Special episodes

The Bill broadcast two live episodes. The first was in 2003 to celebrate the 20th anniversary of the pilot, Woodentop. The second was in 2005 to celebrate the 50th birthday of ITV.

The live episode in 2003 was episode No. 162, originally broadcast on 30 October 2003 at 8 pm, and produced with a crew of 200 staff including seven camera crews. It was reported to be the first live television broadcast of a programme where filming was not largely confined to a studio. Detective Constable Juliet Becker and Constable Cathy Bradford are being held hostage by a man called Mark in a van in the station yard. Bradford raises the custody suite alarm. When the rest of the station arrive outside, Mark makes it known that he intends to kill Becker. The police get permission to break into the carrier, only to find that Juliet has been stabbed. She is rushed to hospital, but attempts to resuscitate her fail. The episode was watched by around 10 million viewers. This special was later released onto DVD in United Kingdom 31 October 2011, as part of Network DVD's "Soap Box: Volume 1".

The live episode in 2005 was episode No. 349, broadcast on 22 September 2005 at 8 pm. In this episode, it was revealed that PC Gabriel Kent had assumed a false identity. It is revealed that he has been operating under his brother's name and is, in fact, David Kent. In this episode the "real" Gabriel Kent arrived in Sun Hill to meet his mother, Sergeant June Ackland. In this episode, Sun Hill police station is hosting a reception party and, as the police arrive, they are taken hostage by a distraught father whose son was killed by a stolen car. A struggle ensues in which a shot is fired, alerting others in the building the incident. After an evacuation of the station, Superintendent Amanda Prosser encourages PC Dan Casper to attempt to overpower the man. As he does so, both Casper and the real Gabriel Kent are shot. The real Gabriel Kent is rushed to hospital where the false Gabriel Kent threatens him to keep the identity switch a secret.

A series of special episodes titled The Bill Uncovered were produced to reflect the stories of select characters and events. The first was The Bill Uncovered : Des and Reg (2004) – The story of the unusual friendship between PC Des Taviner and PC Reg Hollis, traversing their history from Des's first day at Sun Hill to his death in a Sun Hill cell.
The second was The Bill Uncovered : Kerry's Story (2004), the story of PC Kerry Young, who met her death outside Sun Hill. The third special was The Bill Uncovered : Jim's Story (2005), the story of DC Jim Carver – from his first day at Sun Hill (in the pilot "Woodentop"). The last was The Bill Uncovered: On The Front Line (2006), in which Superintendent Adam Okaro recounts the extraordinary events that have surrounded Sun Hill over his time in charge. A review of the second of these specials criticised the "increasingly degenerative plotlines" of the series, and characterised the special as a "cheerless outing" covering The Bill's "travesties of plot". All four editions of The Bill Uncovered were released on DVD in Australia as part of The Bill Series 26 DVD boxset, 30 April 2014.

In 2008 a special programme called "The Bill Made Me Famous" in light of the show's 25th anniversary was broadcast, which saw former actors and special guest stars telling their accounts of working on the show and how it changed their lives. It included old favourites such as Billy Murray (DS Don Beech), Chris Ellison (DI Frank Burnside) and popular TV personalities such as Paul O'Grady and Les Dennis.

A two-part crossover episode with the German series Leipzig Homicide, entitled "Proof of Life", was broadcast in November 2008. This included scenes filmed in Germany; other countries in which episodes were filmed included France (Foreign Body, 1999) and Australia (Beech on the Run, 2001).

Following The Bill's final episode, on 31 August 2010, a one-hour special titled Farewell The Bill was broadcast. The special explored the history of the series and gave viewers a behind the scenes look at the filming of the last episode. This special was later released on DVD in Australia on 5 October 2011, along with the last two-part episode "Respect".

Cast

The Bill had a large regular cast to support the number of episodes that were produced each year. Working on The Bill had become something of a comical joke in British acting, with 174 actors having formed part of the series' main cast since the series began.

Notable cast members
The following list contains characters whose roles transformed the series, and in some cases led to spin-offs, as well as characters who hold individual accolades for their time on the series. An expanded version is available at List of characters of The Bill.
 Billy Murray played Don Beech from 1995 to 2004. The character was a corrupt detective sergeant from 1995 to 2000 whose notoriety in the role led to its own scandal, with the defining moment being his killing of fellow DS John Boulton. Beech later featured in a 90-minute special Beech on the Run, filmed in Australia, and led to the six-part Beech is Back spin-off, both of which aired in 2001. His final stint on the series came in 2004 when he made six appearances as a prisoner turned informant as part of an elaborate scheme that saw him escape from prison
 Tony O'Callaghan played Sergeant Matt Boyden from 1991 to 2003. Boyden's murder at the hands of his daughter's boyfriend formed the basis for the pilot of spin-off M.I.T.: Murder Investigation Team.
 Diane Parish as DC Eva Sharpe was the only character to appear as a regular on both The Bill (2002-2004) and the MIT spin-off (2005). A handful of the cast from spring 2003, when the MIT pilot aired, appeared in the spin-off - but only for that one episode.
 Christopher Ellison played Frank Burnside from 1984 to 2000. Burnside was a recurring character as a DS in the early years before becoming Sun Hill's DI in 1988, a role he held for five years. After a five year absence, Burnside returned as a DCI with the National Crime Squad before being written out in 2000 to star in his own spin-off, Burnside, however it lasted for just one series before being axed. Burnside made many enemies both at Sun Hill and with the villains, indeed Chief Superintendent Pearson tried to frame Burnside in a corruption inquiry.
 Mark Wingett played Jim Carver from 1983 to 2005. Jim was the central protagonist in the pilot Woodentop, the episode centred around his first day at Sun Hill as a probationary PC. A promotion to DC in 1988 saw him in CID until 1999, when he was transferred back to uniform so the series could highlight the real-life Metropolitan Police's controversial tenure system that saw officers moved back to uniform if they hadn't been considered for promotion after ten years in the same role. Addiction to alcohol and a marriage that saw him domestically abused came before his return to DC in 2004, with a gambling addiction and marriage to long-term friend June Ackland coming before his exit in 2005. He came back as a DS in 2007 for June's final three episodes, revealing he moved to Manchester after leaving Sun Hill.
 Trudie Goodwin portrayed June Ackland from 1983 to 2007. She initially appeared as a WPC in the pilot who puppywalked Jim Carver on his first day on the job. She was promoted to Sergeant in 1996 and held that rank until her exit in 2007. Her time in the role broke a world record for the longest time an actor had portrayed a police officer.
 Eric Richard played Sergeant Bob Cryer from 1984 to 2001, making him the longest serving sergeant on the series. The character was axed in a plot that saw him accidentally shot by then PC Dale Smith. The character later made brief re-appearances in the series between 2002 and 2004, and Moya Brady was cast to portray his niece Roberta from 2002 to 2003.
 Kevin Lloyd played DC Tosh Lines from 1988 to 1998. The character was written out as having accepted a position in the Coroner's Office after Lloyd was sacked for turning up for work drunk. Lloyd died a week after his dismissal, meaning he appeared on screen for over a month after his death.
 Jeff Stewart played PC Reg Hollis from 1984 to 2008, which made him the character with the longest run on the series. The character was seen as the station "odd-ball" and took part in several major plots, including being injured in the 1990 station fire and forming an unlikely friendship with brute PC turned cop-killer Des Taviner. Reg was written out after resigning following the death of a colleague in a bomb blast, his scripted exit never airing after a devastated Stewart attempted suicide on set by slashing his wrists after learning of his dismissal after 24 years.
 Graham Cole played PC Tony Stamp from 1987 to 2009, and was also an uncredited extra from 1984 to 1987. The character was key to several major plots throughout the series including killing a pedestrian on duty and being accused of sexual assault on a minor. When the series revamped in 2009 he was written out after 1204 credited appearances, more than any other character in the series history. The character took up a driving instructor's post at Hendon after being the show's primary advanced driver since his debut.
 Alex Walkinshaw played Dale "Smithy" Smith from 1999 to 2010. He joined as a PC in 1999 before being written out in 2001, his exit coming due to a clash with new station Superintendent Tom Chandler. He returned as a sergeant in 2003 before a promotion to inspector in 2009, making him the only character on the series to play a regular role in all three ranks below the top brass positions.
 Simon Rouse played Jack Meadows from 1990 to 2010. He joined as a recurring cast member in 1990 when he was a Detective Superintendent with AMIP (Area Major Investigation Pool), later renamed MIT (Murder Investigation Team). His demotion to DCI in 1992 saw him take over the post at Sun Hill, holding the rank until 2009 when he was promoted back to superintendent. He was the longest serving character by the series finale and appeared in 884 episodes, recording more appearances than any other top brass officer. He also made an appearance on Leipzig Homicide in 2012, where it was revealed the character had retired since the series finale.
 Colin Tarrant played Inspector Andrew Monroe from 1990 to 2002 when he was axed as part of a series overhaul. Appearing in 704 episodes meant no other Inspector or DI made more appearances than him.

Notable guest stars
The constant need for minor characters, normally appearing in only a single episode, inevitably led to numerous guest roles in The Bill being played by actors and actresses who later achieved a high profile, some of whom appeared as child actors. The following actors appeared in the show at least once.

 Sean Bean (1984)
 Paul O'Grady (1988 and 1990)
 Mark Strong (1990)
 Andy Serkis (1990)
 Anthony Daniels (1992)
 Brendan Coyle (1992)
 Pete Postlethwaite (1992)
 Steve Shill (1992)
 Tim McInnerny (1992)
 Emma Bunton (1993)
 Stephen K Amos (1993)
 Russell Brand (1994)
 Idris Elba (1994 and 1995)
 David Tennant (1995)
 Keira Knightley (1995)
 James McAvoy (1997)
 Martin Freeman (1997)
 Emmanuel Petit (1998)
 Nicholas Hoult (2000)
 David Walliams (2002)
 Jack O'Connell (2005)

Some guest parts were also played by guest actors who were already well known when they appeared, including:

 Ray Winstone (1991 and 1995)
 Leslie Phillips (1996)
 Rik Mayall (1997)
 Hugh Laurie (1998)
 Roger Daltrey (1999)
 Lynda Bellingham (2004)
 Andrew Sachs (2006)

Ratings
The Bill was a popular drama in the United Kingdom and in many other countries, most notably in Australia.

The series attracted audiences of up to six million viewers in 2008 and 2009. Ratings during 2002 peaked after the overhaul of the show which brought about the 2002 fire episode, in which six officers were killed, and the 2003 live episode attracted 10 million viewers – 40% of the UK audience share. Immediately following The Bill'''s revamping and time slot change, it was reported that the programme had attracted 4.5 million viewers, 19% of the audience share, but it lost out in the ratings to the BBC's New Tricks, with the Daily Mirror later reporting that ITV's schedule change was behind a two million viewer drop in ratings.

In 2001, prior to Paul Marquess's appointment as executive producer, ratings had dropped to approximately six million viewers, and advertising revenues had fallen, in part due to the ageing demographic of its viewers, leading ITV to order a "rejuvenation", which saw the series adopt a serial format.

In 2002, The Independent reported that The Bill's Thursday episode was viewed by approximately 7 million people, a fall of approximately 3 million viewers in the space of six months. After the cast clearout resulting from the Sun Hill fire in April 2002, BBC News reported that the show attracted 8.6 million viewers, the highest figure for the year to that point, and by October 2003, the program had around 8 million viewers each week.

In 2005, The Bill was averaging around 11 million viewers, in comparison to Coronation Street, which was attracting around 10 million viewers.

In 2009, The Daily Mirror reported that The Bill was to be moved to a post-watershed slot to allow it to cover grittier storylines. It was reported that it was the first time in British Television that ITV had broadcast a drama all year in the 9 pm slot. The changeover happened at the end of July 2009.  Before the move, the program was averaging 5 million viewers between the two episodes each week. BARB reported that the week of 12–18 October 2009 saw 3.78 million viewers watch the show.

AwardsThe Bill has achieved a number of awards throughout its time on air, ranging from a BAFTA to the Royal Television Society Awards. and the Inside Soap Awards, particularly the Best Recurring Drama category.

In 2010, The Bill was nominated for a Royal Television Society award for Best Soap/Continuing Drama, beating both Coronation Street and Emmerdale onto the nominations list. The only soap to be nominated was EastEnders and the results were announced on 16 March 2010. In 2009 an episode of The Bill won the Knights of Illumination Award for Lighting Design- Drama.

Impact and history

It has been compared to Hill Street Blues due to the similar, serial, format that both series take. However, The Bill has seen little direct competition on British television in the police procedural genre over its 25-year history, though the BBC has twice launched rival series. The first was Merseybeat, which ran from 2001 but was cancelled in 2004 due to poor ratings and problems with the cast. The second, HolbyBlue, launched in 2007, was a spin-off of successful medical drama Holby City (itself a spin-off of the long-running Casualty). It was scheduled to go "head to head" with The Bill, prompting a brief "ratings war" but, in 2008, HolbyBlue was also cancelled by the BBC, again, largely due to poor ratings.

When The Bill started, the majority of the Police Federation were opposed to the programme, claiming that it portrayed the police as a racist organisation, but feelings towards the programme later mellowed, to the extent that, in 2006, executive producer, Johnathan Young, met Sir Ian Blair, then Commissioner of the Met, and it was decided that the editorial relationship between the police and the programme was sufficient. However, Young stressed that The Bill is not "editorially bound" to the police.

Despite better relations with the police, The Bill was still not without controversy.  It was sometimes criticised for the high levels of violence, especially prior to 2009, when it occupied a pre-watershed timeslot. Specific story lines also came under fire in the media, such as that involving a gay kiss in 2002, as well as an episode broadcast in March 2008 which featured a fictional treatment for multiple sclerosis, leading the MS Society to brand the plot "grossly irresponsible".

Spin-offs and related series
During its 27-year-run, The Bill spawned several spin-off productions and related series in German and Dutch languages, as well as a series of documentaries. The following is a list of the most notable of these.
 Bureau Kruislaan: Dutch interpretation of the series. Produced by Joop van den Ende for VARA Television, the programme lasted for four series running from 1992 to 1995. In 1995, the show was nominated for the Gouden Televizier Ring, an award for the best television programme in the Netherlands. All four series of the show have been released on DVD there.
 Die Wache: German interpretation of the series. As decent script-writers were hard to find at the time, the German producers were given the licence to use (re-use) scripts from the British series. The series was produced by RTL Television, running for nearly 250 episodes from 1994 to 2006.
 Burnside: Spin-off from the main British series, following ex-DI Frank Burnside in his transfer and promotion to the National Crime Squad. The programme lasted for just a single series of six episodes, debuting in the UK on 6 July 2000. The series was created and produced by Richard Handford. On 8 October 2008, the series was released on DVD in Australia in a three-disc-set.
 MIT: Murder Investigation Team'': Spin-off from the main British series. Lasting for two series, the drama began with a group of MIT officers investigating the drive-by shooting of Sgt. Matthew Boyden, who had been at Sun Hill for eleven years. The first series consisted of eight one-hour episodes. The second series consisted of four ninety-minute episodes. The series was created by Paul Marquess, produced by Johnathan Young and starred ex-Bill DC Eva Sharpe (Diane Parish).

Merchandise

VHS and DVD

Books

Novels

Music

Merchandising

See also
 "Woodentop" (The Bill)

References

External links

 
 
 
 

 
1983 British television series debuts
2010 British television series endings
1980s British crime drama television series
1980s British police procedural television series
1980s British workplace drama television series
1990s British crime drama television series
1990s British police procedural television series
1990s British workplace drama television series
2000s British crime drama television series
2000s British police procedural television series
2000s British workplace drama television series
2010s British crime drama television series
2010s British police procedural television series
2010s British workplace drama television series
English-language television shows
ITV crime dramas
Television shows produced by Thames Television
Television shows shot in London
Television series by Fremantle (company)
Television shows set in London